Shahin Dezh County is in West Azerbaijan province, Iran. The capital of the county is the city of Shahin Dezh. At the 2006 census, the county's population was 89,356 in 20,911 households. The following census in 2011 counted 91,113 people in 24,572 households. At the 2016 census, the county's population was 92,456 in 27,669 households.

Administrative divisions

The population history of Shahin Dezh County's administrative divisions over three consecutive censuses is shown in the following table. The latest census shows two districts, five rural districts, and three cities.

References

 

Counties of West Azerbaijan Province